John Whitefield Owens (November 2, 1884 – April 24, 1968) was the 1937 Pulitzer Prize winner for editorial writing for his editorials in the Baltimore Sun.

References
"Who's who of Pulitzer Prize winners" pg. 168

Pulitzer Prize for Editorial Writing winners
1884 births
1968 deaths